The 1979–80 Vancouver Canucks season was the team's 10th in the NHL. Stan Smyl led the team in goals, assists, points, and penalty minutes, the last time one player has led his team in all four categories. On October 14, 1979, Wayne Gretzky scored his first NHL goal against Glen Hanlon.

Regular season

Final standings

Schedule and results

Playoffs

Draft picks
Vancouver's picks at the 1979 NHL Entry Draft. The draft was held on August, 1979 at the Queen Elizabeth Hotel in Montreal, Quebec, Canada.

See also
1979–80 NHL season

References

Vancouver Canucks seasons
Vancouver C
Vancouver
Vancouver Canucks
Vancouver Canucks